Ghost Train is a children's picture book by Chinese-Canadian historian and writer Paul Yee. It is illustrated with oil paintings by Chinese-Canadian artist Harvey Chan. The book was first published in 1996.

Plot
The story, first published in Canada, is told through the eyes of a young girl, Choon-yi, born to poor peasants in southern China. She has only one arm, and her mother rejects her, but her father loves her dearly and encourages her artistic gift. When she is 12, her father leaves for America to work on the railway being built through the mountains. After two years he sends her money to join him, but when she gets there, she learns that her father has died. He appears to her in a dream and asks her to paint him on the train he built. The full-page paintings show her traveling on the hurtling engines; they represent the power of the railroad and the sorrow of the men who died building it, their clothing stained with mud and blood.

Awards
 1996 Governor General's Literary Award for Children's Literature 
 1997 Ruth Schwartz Children's Book Award
 1997 Amelia Frances Howard-Gibbon Illustrator's Award
 1998 Prix Enfantasie (Switzerland)(Winner; for French language version: Le train fantôme)

Adaptation
Ghost Train was adapted as a play by Betty Quan and performed by the Young People's Theatre in Toronto in 2001.

References

External links

Author's website
Illustrator's website

1996 children's books
Canadian children's books
Canadian picture books
Books by Paul Yee
Chinese-Canadian culture
Governor General's Award-winning children's books
Children's books about rail transport
Books about immigration to the United States
Children's fiction books
United States in fiction
Asian-Canadian literature